Voice of Hope Ministries, Inc. is an American non-profit organization operating in Texas.

Voice of Hope, founded in 1982 by Kathy Dudley is a Christian community center founded on principles of self-help, spiritual enrichment and urban renewal. Voice of Hope seeks to provide children living in the neighborhoods of West Dallas with strong character models, education support, life skills, and family support services needed to become productive Christian citizens." Inner-city families are equipped with resources and skills needed to overcome and break the poverty cycle.   

The agency's current chief executive officer is Edward Franklin.

Programs

In meeting the needs of the whole child, Voice of Hope offers programs for youth 4–18 years old, including the Aspire After School program, Summer Day Camp, Out of Boundz and family & community outreach services.

Youth Programs

ASPIRE after school program is held during the school year. This program provides students with homework help, a hot meal, friendship and Christian fellowship.

Summer Day Camp (SDC) is held for 8 weeks in the summer.  SDC gives students the opportunity to continue to practice academic skills, build personal character, explore the community through field trips, and enjoy various recreational activities. Voice of Hope also takes many student to Kids Across America each summer.

The Out of Boundz Program is held year around. It includes Friday Night Gym Lights basketball league, West Dallas Select team, Mission Impact and Youth Leadership Academy. These activities give young men constructive alternatives and also allow them to learn about teamwork, leadership and helps them develop Christian values.

Family and Community Support

Voice of Hope's Food Pantry (in partnership with the North Texas Food Bank) provides emergency assistance with food to West Dallas residents.

Fruits and Vegetables Outreach (in partnership with Hardies Fresh Fruits & Vegetables) provide fresh fruits and vegetables to families in West Dallas helping them to eat healthier and live healthier lives

Holiday outreach events in partnership with churches and other organization help families during various holidays throughout the year. Helping to lighten the burden and provide encouragement.

Voice of Hope hosts the Ledbetter Gardens community neighborhood watch meetings and a weekly Bible study for senior citizens.

Community Partners

Voice of Hope Ministries partners with the North Texas Food Bank to provide meals to the children and families of the community. Voice of Hope also partners with various schools in the Dallas Independent School District to provide programming at community school sites. Other partners include World Vision, the YMCA, Young Life, Mercy Street Dallas, and the West Dallas Initiative.

Footnotes

External links
 Voice of Hope Ministries

Non-profit organizations based in Texas